Henry Alexander Douglas (22 February 1821 – 13 December 1875) was the third Bishop of Bombay from 1869 to 1875.

Early life
Born into a noble family he was a son of Henry Alexander Douglas of Lockerbie and Elizabeth Dalzell, who both died in 1837. Among his siblings were John Douglas, 7th Premier of Queensland and Robert Johnstone-Douglas (father of Arthur Johnstone-Douglas). His father was the third son of Sir William Douglas, 4th Baronet of Kelhead, and was a brother of the sixth and seventh Marquesses of Queensberry.

Douglas was educated at Sherborne and Balliol College, Oxford.

Career
He was Vicar of Abbotsley (1849-55), then Dean of Cape Town before his elevation to the episcopate,  he was a "moderate high churchman". He died on 13 December 1875 and his papers published posthumously.

His successor as Dean of Cape Town was a long serving Charles Barnett-Clarke.

Personal life
On 20 November 1849, Douglas married Eliza Hoskins, daughter of James Hoskins. Together, they were the parents of:

 Margaret Douglas (–1943), who died unmarried.
 Catherine Mary Grey Douglas (–1942), who married the Rev. Francis Ainger in 1894.
 Archibald Charles Douglas (1861–1939), who married Betty McClelland, a daughter of Andrew Simpson McClelland, in 1896.
 Katherine Helen Douglas (1864–1953), who died unmarried.

Douglas died on 13 December 1875 at age 54.

References 

1821 births
1875 deaths

People educated at Sherborne School
Alumni of Balliol College, Oxford
Anglican bishops of Bombay
Deans of Cape Town